The 2008 County Championship season, known as the LV County Championship for sponsorship reasons, was contested through two divisions: Division One and Division Two. Each team plays all the others in their division both home and away. The top two teams from Division Two are promoted to the first division for 2009, while the bottom two sides from Division 1 are relegated. Durham won the tournament, their first title, after beating Kent in their final match.

Teams in the County Championship 2008:

Points system
Fourteen points were awarded for each win, four points were awarded for a draw or abandonment. Defeats scored no points. Teams were awarded bonus points during the first 130 overs of their first innings; one bowling point for every three wickets taken (up to three points available), and one batting point gained when teams reached 200, 250, 300, 350 and 400 runs (up to five points available).

Division One

Standings

Division two

Standings

Records

See also

2008 English cricket season

References

External links
2008 County Championship  at CricketArchive
2008 County Championship at Cricinfo:
2008 County Championship - Division One
2008 County Championship - Division Two
BBC Wear - Pictures - Durham celebrate winning the County Championship 2008 for the first time

County Championship seasons
County Championship, 2008